A ballast tank is a compartment within a boat, ship or other floating structure that holds water, which is used as ballast to provide hydrostatic stability for a vessel, to reduce or control buoyancy, as in a submarine, to correct trim or list, to provide a more even load distribution along the hull to reduce structural hogging or sagging stresses, or to increase draft, as in a semi-submersible vessel or platform, or a SWATH, to improve seakeeping. Using water in a tank provides easier weight adjustment than the stone or iron ballast used in older vessels, and makes it easy for the crew to reduce a vessel's draft when it enters shallower water, by temporarily pumping out ballast. Airships use ballast tanks mainly to control buoyancy and correct trim.

History 
The basic concept behind the ballast tank can be seen in many forms of aquatic life, such as the blowfish or argonaut octopus. The concept has been invented and reinvented many times by humans to serve a variety of purposes.

The first documented example of a submarine using a ballast tank was in David Bushnell's Turtle, which was the first submarine to ever be used in combat in 1776. In 1849 Abraham Lincoln, then an Illinois attorney, patented a ballast-tank system to enable cargo vessels to pass over shoals in North American rivers.

Ships 
Ballast is used in surface vessels to alter the draft, trim, list and stability. It may also be used to modify structural load distribution, usually the longitudinal load distribution which affects hogging and sagging stresses. It may also be used to change the moments of inertia which affect motion in a seaway. International agreements under the Safety Of Life At Sea (SOLAS) Convention require that cargo vessels and passenger ships be constructed to withstand certain kinds of damage. The criteria specify the separation of compartments within the vessel, and the subdivision of those compartments. These International agreements rely on the states that signed the agreement to implement the regulations within their waters and on vessels entitled to fly their flag. Ballast may be used to compensate for stability losses due to flooding of some compartments.

The ballast is generally the water in which the vessel is floating at the time of ballasting, such as seawater, pumped into ballast tanks. Depending on the type of vessel, the tanks can be double bottom (extending across the breadth of the vessel), wing tanks (located on the outboard area from keel to deck) or hopper tanks (occupying the upper corner section between hull and main deck). These ballast tanks are connected to  pumps that pump water in or out. Crews fill these tanks to add weight to the ship and improve its stability when it isn't carrying cargo. In extreme conditions, a crew may pump ballast water into dedicated cargo spaces to add extra weight during heavy weather or to pass under low bridges.

Submarines 

In submersibles and submarines, ballast tanks are used to control the buoyancy of the vessel.

Some submersibles, such as bathyscaphes, dive and re-surface solely by controlling their buoyancy. They flood ballast tanks to submerge, then to re-surface either drop discardable ballast weights, or use stored compressed air to blow their ballast tanks clear of water, becoming buoyant again.

Submarines are larger, more sophisticated and have powerful underwater propulsion. They must travel horizontal distances submerged, require precise control of depth, yet do not descend so deeply, nor need to dive vertically on station. Their primary means of controlling depth are their diving planes (hydroplanes in UK), in combination with forward motion. At the surface the ballast tanks are emptied to give positive buoyancy. When diving, the main ballast tanks are flooded to achieve approximately neutral buoyancy. Depth control tanks are used for fine control of buoyancy by pumping water in or out to compensate for variations in weight. Ballast water can be transferred between trim tanks to balance the vessel in horizontal trim. The planes are then adjusted together to drive the hull downwards, while still level. For a steeper dive, the stern planes may be reversed and used to pitch the hull downwards.

The crew submerges the vessel by opening vents in the top of the main ballast tanks and opening valves in the bottom. This lets water flood into the tank as air escapes through the top vents. As air escapes from the tank, the vessel's buoyancy decreases, causing it to sink. For the submarine to surface, the crew shuts the vents in the top of the ballast tanks and releases compressed air into the tanks. The high-pressure air accumulates at the top of the tanks and the air pocket pushes the water out through the bottom valves and increases the vessel's buoyancy, causing it to rise. As it rises, hydrostatic pressure decreases, causing the air to expand in the tanks and accelerate ascent rate until excess escapes through the bottom valves and maximum buoyancy occurs. A submarine may have several types of ballast tank: main ballast tanks for diving and surfacing, and trimming tanks for adjusting the submarine's attitude (its 'trim') both on the surface and when underwater, and depth control tanks for fine adjustments of buoyancy.

Floating structures
Ballast tanks are also integral to the stability and operation of deepwater offshore oil platforms and floating wind turbines. The ballast increases "hydrostatic stability by moving the center of mass as low as possible, placing it beneath the centre of buoyancy." Ballast may also be adjusted to convert a platform from a deep draught reduced waterplane area mode optimised for minimum motion in a seaway to a lower drag towing mode.

A floating dry dock is ballasted to sink the supporting deck below the depth of the vessel to be docked, and after the vessel has been moved over this surface and secured in place, the ballast is discharged to lift the docking platform and the docked vessel above the water. To make this possible, most of the structure under the supporting deck is divided into ballast tanks. A floating boat lift is a smaller version working on the same principle, which may be dedicated as the storage facility for a specific vessel.

Dry dock and lock caisson gates are floated into position over the sill, then the ballast tanks are flooded to hold the gate in place and make a seal while the dock or lock is drained.

Wakeboard boats

Most wakeboard-specific inboard-engine boats have multiple integrated ballast tanks that are filled with water by ballast pumps controlled from the helm with rocker switches. Typically the configuration is based on a three tank system with a tank in the center of the boat and two more in the rear of the boat on either side of the engine compartment. Just like larger ships when adding water ballast to smaller wakeboard boats the hull has a lower center of gravity, and increases the draft of the boat. Most wakeboard boat factory ballast systems can be upgraded with larger capacities by adding soft structured ballast bags. Increasing the displacement by ballasting causes the boat to make larger waves at any given speed, at the cost of greater power requirements and propeller loading to reach that speed.

Aircraft
Ballast tanks are also used in some types of aircraft:
 Aerostats (balloons and airships)
 Gliders

Environmental concerns

Ballast water taken into a tank from one body of water and discharged in another body of water can introduce invasive species of aquatic life. The taking in of water from ballast tanks has been responsible for the introduction of species that cause environmental and economic damage like zebra mussels in the Great Lakes of Canada and the United States, for example.

Non native macroinvertebrates can find their way into a ballast tank. This can cause problems ecologically and economically. Macro-invertebrates are transported by transoceanic and coastal vessels arriving in ports all over the world. Researchers from Switzerland sampled 67 ballast tanks from 62 different vessels operating along geographic pathways, and tested for mid ocean exchange or voyage length that had a high chance of macro-invertebrate relocating to a different part of the world. An assessment was done between the relationship of macro-invertebrate presence, and the amount of sediment in ballast tanks.  They discovered a presence of a highly invasive European green crab, mud crab, common periwinkle, soft-shell clam, and blue mussel in the ballast tanks of the sampled ships. Although the densities of macro-invertebrate were low, invasion of non-native macro-invertebrates can be worrisome during their mating season. The most serious effect is observed when a female macro-invertebrate is carrying millions of eggs per animal.

Migration of living animals and settling particle-attached organisms can lead to changed distributions of biota at different locations of the world.  When small organisms escape from a ballast tank, the foreign organism can upset the ecological balance of the local habitat and potentially damage the existing life.  Vessel workers check the ballast tank for living organisms ≥50 μm in discrete segments of the drain, it also represents the level of sedimentary of different rock or soil in the tank.  Throughout the sample collection, concentrations of organisms varied in result in the drain segments, patterns also varied in level of stratification in other trials.  The best sampling strategy for stratified tanks is to collect various time-integrated samples spaced evenly throughout each discharge.

All transoceanic vessels that enter the Great Lakes are required to manage ballast water and ballast tank residuals with ballast water to clear out and exchange for tank flushing. Management and procedures reduce the density and richness of biota effectively in ballast waters and thus reduce the risk of transporting organisms from other parts of the world to non-native areas. Although most ships do ballast water management not all are able to clear the tanks. In an emergency, when the crew can clean out residual organisms, they use sodium chloride (salt) brine to treat the ballast tanks. Vessels arriving in the Great Lakes, and North Sea ports, were exposed to high concentrations of sodium chloride until the mortality rate of 100% is reached. Results show that an exposure of 115% of brine is extremely effective treatment resulting in a 99.9 mortality rate of living organisms in ballast tanks regardless of the type of organism. There was a median of 0%. About 0.00–5.33 of organisms are expect to survive treatment of the sodium chloride. 

The Ballast Water Management Convention, adopted by the International Maritime Organization (IMO) on 13 February 2004, aims to prevent the spread of harmful aquatic organisms  from one region to another, by establishing standards and procedures for the management and control of ships' ballast water and sediments. This entered into force worldwide on 8 September 2017. Under the convention, all ships in international traffic are required to manage their ballast water and sediments to a certain standard, according to a ship-specific ballast water management plan. All ships will also have to carry a ballast water record book and an international ballast water management certificate. The ballast water management standards will be phased in over a period of time. As an intermediate solution, ships should exchange ballast water mid-ocean. However, eventually most ships will need to install an on-board ballast water treatment system.

A number of guidelines have been developed to help implement the convention. The convention will require all ships to implement a Ballast Water and Sediments Management Plan. All ships will have to carry a Ballast Water Record Book and will be required to carry out ballast water management procedures to a given standard. Existing ships will be required to do the same, but after a phase-in period.

One of the most common problems in vessel maintenance is the corrosion that takes place in the double hull space ballast tanks occupy in merchant vessels. Bio-degradation of ballast tank coatings takes place in marine environments.  Ballast tanks usually carry bacteria and other organisms, some of which can damage the ballast tank coating and structure.

Micro-cracks and small holes have been found in ballast tanks. Acidic bacteria created holes with 0.2–0.9 μm in length and  4–9 μm in width. The natural community caused cracks of 2–8 μm in depth and 1 μm in length. The bacterial affected coatings decreased in corrosion resistance, as assessed by Electrochemical Impedance Spectroscopy (EIS).

The natural bacterial community causes a loss in coating corrosion resistance over time, declining after 40 days of exposure, resulting in blisters in the ballast tank surface. Bacteria might be linked to certain bio-film patterns affecting various types of coating attacks.

See also

 Corrosion in ballast tanks

References

Buoyancy devices
Submarine design
Watercraft components